Carl Albert Paulson (born December 29, 1970) is an American professional golfer.

Paulson attended the University of South Carolina where he was an All-American and the Southeastern Conference Player of the Year in 1993.

Paulson turned professional in 1994 and was medalist at the 1995 PGA Tour Qualifying Tournament. He was a member of the PGA Tour in 1995 and 1996 and from 2000 to 2008. He was a member of the Nike Tour from 1997 to 1999 and led the Nike Tour's money list in 1999. Paulson did not play in another PGA Tour event until 2011 after sustaining back injuries at the U.S. Bank Championship in Milwaukee on July 21, 2005. He withdrew from that event and was sidelined for an extended period. He earned his card for 2006 through a major medical exemption but did not play in any events due to the chronic nature of his injuries. He returned to competition in 2010 on the Nationwide Tour.

Paulson wrote the book, Rookie on Tour, with Virginia psychologist Louis Janda. It was published in 1999.

Paulson is currently the co-host of "Inside the Ropes" on SiriusXM radio and a volunteer coach for the South Carolina Gamecocks men's golf team.

Professional wins (2)

Nike Tour wins (2)

Nike Tour playoff record (0–1)

Results in major championships

Note: Paulson never played in the Masters Tournament.

CUT = missed the half-way cut

Results in The Players Championship

WD = withdrew
"T" indicates a tie for a place

See also

1994 PGA Tour Qualifying School graduates
1995 PGA Tour Qualifying School graduates
1999 Nike Tour graduates
2004 PGA Tour Qualifying School graduates

References

External links

American male golfers
South Carolina Gamecocks men's golfers
PGA Tour golfers
Korn Ferry Tour graduates
Golfers from Virginia
Golfers from Orlando, Florida
People from Quantico, Virginia
1970 births
Living people